Emarginula amyda is a species of sea snail, a marine gastropod mollusk in the family Fissurellidae, the keyhole limpets and slit limpets.

Distribution
This marine species occurs off Japan.

References

External links
 To World Register of Marine Species

Fissurellidae
Gastropods described in 1962